Periyavalayam is a village in the Udayarpalayam taluk of Ariyalur district, Tamil Nadu, India.

Demographics 

As per the 2001 census, Periyavalayam had a total population of 3305 with 1602 males and 1703 females.

Places near Periyavalayam 
Angarayanallur, Chinnavalayam, Jayankondam, Kaluvanthondi, Karadikulam, Kilakudiyiruppu, and Sengunthapuram post offices share the same Postal Index (PIN) Code: 621802.
Gangaikonda cholapuram, the famous temple is just 10.00 km away from Periyavalayam.

References 

Villages in Ariyalur district